Rinar Valeyev (born 22 August 1987) is a professional Ukrainian football midfielder who plays for German Oberliga Niederrhein club FSV Duisburg.

Career
He joined Chornomorets during the winter transfer window, in January 2007, on a three-year contract. His debut for Stal Alchevsk came on 23 August 2008 in a 3–1 defeat of FC Knyazha Schaslyve. He played for Illichivets Mariupol.

His older brother, Ruslan Valeyev is also a football player, who played for Chornomorets during the 2007–08 season together with Rinar.

References

External links

1987 births
Footballers from Odesa
Ukrainian people of Tatar descent
Living people
Ukrainian footballers
Association football midfielders
Ukrainian expatriate footballers
Expatriate footballers in Kazakhstan
Expatriate footballers in Moldova
Expatriate footballers in Belarus
Expatriate footballers in Georgia (country)
Expatriate footballers in Germany
Ukrainian expatriate sportspeople in Kazakhstan
Ukrainian expatriate sportspeople in Moldova
Ukrainian expatriate sportspeople in Belarus
Ukrainian expatriate sportspeople in Georgia (country)
Ukrainian expatriate sportspeople in Germany
Ukrainian Premier League players
Ukrainian First League players
Belarusian Premier League players
Kazakhstan Premier League players
Erovnuli Liga 2 players
Oberliga (football) players
FC Syhnal Odesa players
FC Ivan Odesa players
FC Chornomorets Odesa players
FC Stal Alchevsk players
FC Obolon-Brovar Kyiv players
FC Kryvbas Kryvyi Rih players
FC Irtysh Pavlodar players
FC Mariupol players
FC Hirnyk Kryvyi Rih players
FC Dacia Chișinău players
FC Isloch Minsk Raion players
FC Olimpik Donetsk players
FC Peremoha Dnipro players
FC Shevardeni-1906 Tbilisi players